The Gondola Point Ferry is a cable ferry in the Canadian province of New Brunswick. The ferry crosses the Kennebecasis River, linking Gondola Point in Quispamsis on the southern bank, to Reeds Point on the Kingston Peninsula. The ferry carries New Brunswick Route 119.

Two ferries operate on the crossing, each carrying up to 24 cars at a time. The service operates with a single ferry 24 hours a day all year, with the second ferry brought into service at busy periods. It is operated by the New Brunswick Department of Transportation.

References

External links
Official ferries web page of the New Brunswick Department of Transportation

Ferries of New Brunswick
Cable ferries in Canada